Rozhdestveno:

 Rozhdestveno (Moscow Metro)
 Rozhdestveno Memorial Estate
 Rozhdestveno (military airport)
 Rozhdestveno - settlements in Russia